Edward Russell Mockridge (18 July 1928 – 13 September 1958) was a racing cyclist from Geelong, Victoria, Australia. He died during a race, in collision with a bus.

Family 
The son of Robert Glover Mockridge and Aileen Claire Mockridge, née Riley, Edward Russell Mockridge (known as Russell) was born in Melbourne on 18 July 1928. Mockridge married Irene Pritchard (-2004), widely known as "Rene", in London, in 1953; they had a daughter, Melinda, who was born in Ghent, Belgium in December 1954.

Career
Mockridge started in 1946 by winning his first race of 40 km with Geelong Amateur Cycling Club. For his upper-class accent he was dubbed Little Lord Fauntleroy, but his wins soon earned him the nickname of The Geelong Flyer.  He became described as 'Australia's greatest all-round cyclist for all time'.

His ride in the 1948 Summer Olympics road race in London was ruined by two punctures and his team was eliminated in the quarter-final of the 4000 m team pursuit. He represented Australia at the 1950 British Empire Games in Auckland. He took gold in the 1000 m sprint and the 1000m time trial, and silver in the 4000 m pursuit.

In Paris in July 1952 he won the Amateur Grand Prix and the following day the Open Grand Prix, beating world professional champion Reg Harris, becoming first to win both amateur and professional Paris Sprints. His humiliation of the professionals led to amateur riders being barred for many years. Later that year he won Manchester Wheelers' Club Muratti Cup again beating Reg Harris.

Selection for the 1952 Summer Olympics in Helsinki was in doubt as he refused to sign the Australian Olympic Federation fidelity bond, which demanded he remain amateur for two years after the Games. A great former cyclist, Hubert Opperman, then Federal parliamentarian for Geelong, negotiated a reduction to one year. Mockridge won gold medals in the tandem event with Lionel Cox, and in the 1000 m time trial. He turned professional a year later with success in Europe and Australia. He teamed with Sid Patterson and Reginald Arnold to win the Paris six-day race in 1955. Mockridge was one of 60 of 150 entrants to finish the 1955 Tour de France. He won 12 consecutive Australian championships. He won the Australian national road race title in 1956, 1957 and 1958.

Death 
In 1958, aged 30, he was killed by a bus in Melbourne at the Dandenong Rd and Clayton Rd intersection, two miles from the start of the 225 km Tour of Gippsland race.

Recognition
In 2015, he was an inaugural Cycling Australia Hall of Fame inductee.

See also 
 Cycling in Geelong

References

External links

 
 "Mockridge, Edward Russell (1928–1958)" - Australian Dictionary of Biography, Australian National University
 Official Tour de France results for Russell Mockridge
 "How it feels to be hit by a bus" - a detailed account of the accident which killed Russell Mockridge - newspaper article, The Age (19 Jan 2005)

1928 births
1958 deaths
Australian male cyclists
Olympic cyclists of Australia
Cyclists at the 1948 Summer Olympics
Cyclists at the 1952 Summer Olympics
Olympic gold medalists for Australia
Cyclists at the 1950 British Empire Games
Commonwealth Games gold medallists for Australia
Commonwealth Games silver medallists for Australia
Sportspeople from Geelong
Cyclists from Melbourne
Sport deaths in Australia
Cyclists who died while racing
Road incident deaths in Victoria (Australia)
People educated at Geelong College
Olympic medalists in cycling
Medalists at the 1952 Summer Olympics
Sport Australia Hall of Fame inductees
Commonwealth Games medallists in cycling
Australian track cyclists
Medallists at the 1950 British Empire Games